Richard Massolin (born 21 February 1976) is a former professional footballer who played as a defender. Born and raised in France, Massolin has represented Martinique in international football.

International career
Massolin represented the Martinique national team once in a 2–0 2005 CONCACAF Gold Cup qualification loss to Cuba on 21 December 2004.

Personal life
Massolin was born in metropolitan France to a Martiniquais father and Spanish mother. He is the father of the French footballer Yanis Massolin.

References

External links

1976 births
Living people
People from Vitry-sur-Seine
Footballers from Val-de-Marne
Martiniquais footballers
Martinique international footballers
French footballers
Martiniquais people of Spanish descent
French people of Martiniquais descent
French people of Spanish descent
Association football defenders
Moulins Yzeure Foot players
FC Gueugnon players
Angoulême Charente FC players
Nîmes Olympique players
FC Baulmes players
Al-Muharraq SC players
Al-Faisaly FC players
Paris FC players
Ligue 2 players
Championnat National players
Championnat National 2 players
Championnat National 3 players
Bahraini Premier League players
Saudi Professional League players
French expatriate footballers
French expatriate sportspeople in Bahrain
French expatriate sportspeople in Saudi Arabia
Expatriate footballers in Bahrain
Expatriate footballers in Saudi Arabia